The Rue des Rosiers, which means "street of the rosebushes," is a street in the 4th arrondissement of Paris, France.  It begins at Rue Malher and proceeds northwest across Rue Pavée, Rue Ferdinand Duval, Rue des Écouffes, and Rue des Hospitalières Saint-Gervais before it ends at Rue Vieille du Temple.

Rue des Rosiers lies at the center of the Jewish quarter unofficially called "the Pletzl" (Yiddish for "little place"). Shopping hours are restricted in Paris, but an exception was granted to this area due to Saturday being the Jewish Sabbath.  As a result, cafes and shops are open in this area on Sundays and holidays, which draws large crowds of both Jews and non-Jews.

During the last ten years, the small Jewish shops have been largely crowded out and the Rue des Rosiers has become notable for fashion. The quaint boutiques of days-gone-by have given way to gleaming minimalist showrooms for some of Europe's trendiest labels.

Officially, this street is in the Marais district, which extends along the Rue de Rivoli a short distance away, and some refer to the area as "Saint Paul" because of the proximity of the Place Saint-Paul.

Métro station
The Rue des Rosiers is:

Notable attractions
 L'As du Fallafel - a popular Kosher Middle Eastern restaurant known for its acclaimed falafel sandwich.

In popular culture
The street is the place of the memorable scene of Rabbi Jacob dance (actually shot in rue Jean-Jaurès in Saint-Denis, Seine-Saint-Denis) from the French cult film The Mad Adventures of Rabbi Jacob (1973).

References

Rosiers
Jews and Judaism in Paris
Rosiers